Jeromy Farkas is a Canadian fundraiser, filmmaker, athlete, columnist, and former politician. He was elected to Calgary City Council in the 2017 municipal election to represent Ward 11 for a four-year term.

Farkas ran as a candidate for Calgary mayor in the 2021 municipal election on October 18, 2021, placing second to Jyoti Gondek.

Early life and education 
Farkas was born and raised in the southeast Calgarian neighbourhood of Dover. His father left communist Hungary in 1956 and settled in Calgary.

After graduating from Calgary's Bishop Carroll High School, Farkas pursued a bachelor's degree in political science from the University of Calgary where he worked as the Executive Administrator for the Israel Studies Program and as a Research Team Lead in the Faculty of Medicine.

Farkas served as a senior fellow specializing in municipal governance at the Manning Foundation for Democratic Education from February 2013 to January 2016. He was the project lead for the Council Tracker project and website. He published a report studying City of Calgary Council meetings, examining votes during that period to help the public better understand how council worked, voting blocs, time spent in confidential meetings, among other issues. Farkas expanded the project to other cities throughout Canada, including Toronto. 

Prior to his run for Councillor in Ward 11, Farkas was a regular Calgary Herald columnist writing about local municipal issues, particularly city council.

Political career 
Formerly president of the Wildrose Party's constituency association in Calgary-Elbow, Farkas identifies himself as a fiscal conservative and social liberal. He describes his political views as being motivated by an attitude that "you should have the biggest say in how you live your life... chasing, again, the best solutions rather than the ones based in ideology," and has been active in issues such as wildlife conservation and human rights activism. He is openly bisexual, which made him Calgary's first openly LGBTQ male city councillor, and played a key role in pushing the Wildrose Party to adopt a more progressive position on LGBTQ issues.

Calgary City Council 
From 2017 to 2021, Farkas was the Calgary City Councillor for Ward 11, comprising the neighbourhoods of Acadia, Bayview, Bel-Aire, Braeside, Britannia, Cedarbrae, CFB Currie, CFB Lincoln Park PMQ, Chinook Park, Eagle Ridge, Elbow Park (part), Elboya, Haysboro, Kelvin Grove, Kingsland, Lakeview, Lincoln Park, Mayfair, Meadowlark Park, Mission, North Glenmore Park, Oakridge, Palliser, Parkhill/Stanley Park, Pump Hill, Rideau Park, Roxboro, Rutland Park, Southwood, Willow Park and Windsor Park. Prior to his term, Farkas served on the executive for the Palliser, Bay View, Pump Hill community association.

On his first day, Farkas declined the pension that the mayor and councillors receive. He also declined the transition allowance afforded to him. The Canadian Taxpayer's Federation estimates that if he serves three terms and lives to age eighty-five, these rejected entitlements will save Calgarian taxpayers more than $1.1 million. He also vowed to oppose the city's new southwest bus rapid transit line.

Throughout his term, Farkas has held monthly town hall events during which he answers questions from his constituents off the cuff. When the COVID-19 pandemic rendered such events unsafe, he compensated by hosting weekly Facebook Live sessions.

In December 2017, his proposal for the city to provide additional compensation to residents of the Midfield trailer park, which is being closed due to poor site design that makes it impossible for the city to repair the neighbourhood's failing water and sewer lines without tearing down the homes, failed to advance after Farkas was unable to find a councillor willing to second the motion.

In early 2018, he faced some criticism for being the sole councillor to vote against a motion directing city staff to draft a new parental leave policy for city councillors, on the grounds that taking time away from city council business would be a betrayal of the constituents.

In December 2018, Farkas was kicked out of a council meeting for a Facebook post that claimed that Council salaries would increase in 2019. A later investigation by the City's Chief Financial Officer determined that the formula used by Farkas was materially correct. His actions were called "dishonest and irresponsible” by the mayor. Farkas was accused of grandstanding on the issue from numerous councillors because he was not addressing his concerns through council and proper channels, but rather posting to social media.

In May 2020, Farkas was found guilty of breaching the code of conduct by the integrity commissioner for his Facebook posts in 2018. After the integrity commissioner breached his independence by dining socially with at least one City Councilor, Farkas sought a review by the retired Supreme Court of Canada Justice John Major. Justice Major's independent opinion found that Farkas did not, in fact, beach the code.

On June 16, 2020, Farkas was the only city councillor to vote against the approval of the Calgary Green Line, advocating instead for localized transit improvements at lower overall financial risk.

In March 2021, a complaint with the integrity commission was lodged against Farkas for advertising in wards outside of his own.

On April 26, 2021, Farkas was the only councillor to vote against the Downtown Revitalization Strategy, a plan intending to bring more mixed use activity to downtown Calgary. Given the absence of any focus on flood mitigation or public safety, he argued that it was incomplete.

Also on April 26, 2021, Farkas was one of three councillors who voted against immediately reserving $200 million for the Downtown Revitalization Strategy. Farkas advocated for more broad based tax relief and incentives, rather than focusing financial benefit to specific developers.

On May 10, 2021, Farkas was one of two councillors who voted against a pilot program allowing alcohol consumption in public parks, on the basis that a convoluted administration system was unnecessary. The motion was passed.

On September 22, 2021, a by-law was proposed for proof of COVID vaccinations for certain types of business. This was intended to support business owners in applying the provincial health measures, and encourage more people to be vaccinated during a state of local emergency. Farkas was the only member of council to vote against this by-law based on the risk of increased public confusion over when and where restrictions would apply. It passed 13-1.

2021 Mayoral Campaign 
On September 16, 2020, Farkas announced his candidacy for mayor in the 2021 Calgary municipal election. Farkas' platform included reducing council compensation, opposition to proposals to defund the Calgary Police Service and opposition to tax increases. In the election on October 18, Farkas placed second to Ward 3 councillor Jyoti Gondek.

Electoral record

References 

Living people
Calgary city councillors
Bisexual politicians
Bisexual men
LGBT municipal councillors in Canada
Wildrose Party politicians
Canadian people of Hungarian descent
LGBT conservatism
1986 births
21st-century Canadian politicians
21st-century Canadian LGBT people